Fascination is a 2004 film directed by Klaus Menzel. The screenplay was written by Daryl Haney, John L. Jacobs, and Klaus Menzel.

Plot
Young Scott Doherty gets suspicious when his mother plans to wed Oliver Vance soon after her husband's untimely death. Scott investigates with Oliver's pretty daughter, Kelly, who shared Scott's doubts about the upcoming nuptials. Along the way, he falls in love with Kelly, but a fatal explosion turns Scott's life upside down - and the evidence points to him as the murderer. Has he been framed?

Cast 
 James Naughton as Patrick Doherty
 Jacqueline Bisset as Maureen Doherty
 Adam Garcia as Scott Doherty
 Stuart Wilson as Oliver Vance
 Alice Evans as Kelly Vance
 Craig Cady as Phillip Shields
 Vincent Castellanos as District Attorney
 Jaime Bello as Martin Earnhardt
 Sterling Fitzgerald as Sammi Russell
 Ted Richard as First Detective
 Gary Davies as Second Detective
 Cucho Viera as Pharmacist
 Bill Sloan as E.R. Doctor
 Elia Enid Cadilla as Justice of the Peace
 Idee B. Charriez Millet as Nurse
 J.C. Love as Dr. Reis

References

External links 
 
 

2004 films
American mystery films
American romance films
American thriller films
German thriller films
English-language German films
Metro-Goldwyn-Mayer films
Films scored by John Du Prez
Films with screenplays by Daryl Haney
Films set in Puerto Rico
Films shot in Puerto Rico
2000s American films
2000s German films